Sandro Alfaro Gamboa  (born 1 January 1971 in San Carlos) is a retired Costa Rican professional footballer. He played for several clubs in Costa Rica.

Club career
Alfaro played for Puntarenas from 1990, Asociación Deportiva San Carlos, Club Sport Herediano, L.D. Alajuelense and C.S. Cartaginés. He won the Primera División de Costa Rica with Alajuelense four times, during the 1999-00, 2000–01, 2001–02 and 2002-03 seasons.

International career
Alfaro made his debut for Costa Rica in an April 1991 friendly match against Mexico and has earned a total of 27 caps, scoring 1 goal. He has represented his country in 5 FIFA World Cup qualification matches and played at the 1999 UNCAF Nations Cup and the 1997 Copa América.

His final international was a July 2000 FIFA World Cup qualification match against the United States.

International goals
Scores and results list Costa Rica's goal tally first.

Personal life
Married to Yendry, they have a daughter called María Fernanda.

References

External links
 

1971 births
Living people
People from San Carlos (canton)
Association football defenders
Costa Rican footballers
Costa Rica international footballers
1997 Copa América players
2000 CONCACAF Gold Cup players
Puntarenas F.C. players
A.D. San Carlos footballers
C.S. Herediano footballers
L.D. Alajuelense footballers
C.S. Cartaginés players
Liga FPD players
Copa Centroamericana-winning players